Redox Biology is an open-access peer-reviewed scientific journal and an official journal of the Society for Redox Biology and Medicine and the Society for Free Radical Research-Europe. The journal covers research on redox biology, aging, signaling, biological chemistry and medical implications of free radicals for health and disease. According to the Journal Citation Reports, the journal's 2020 impact factor is 11.799.

Abstracting and indexing 
The journal is abstracted and indexed in ADONIS, BIOSIS, CAB Abstracts, Chemical Abstracts, Current Contents, EMBASE, EMBiology, MEDLINE, Science Citation Index, Scopus and Toxicology Abstracts.

References

External links 
 
 FRBM Society
 SFRR-E society

Monthly journals
English-language journals

Biochemistry journals
Elsevier academic journals